Jhor Esneider Moreno Torres (born 2 October 1995) is a Colombian weightlifter. He won the bronze medal in the men's 96kg event at the 2022 World Weightlifting Championships held in Bogotá, Colombia. He also won the bronze medal in the men's 77kg event at the 2015 Pan American Games held in Toronto, Canada. He is also a two-time gold medalist at the Pan American Weightlifting Championships (2021 and 2022).

Career 

He won the silver medal in his event at the 2017 Pan American Weightlifting Championships held in Miami, United States. In that same year, he competed in the men's 85kg event at the World Weightlifting Championships held in Anaheim, California, United States. He won the bronze medal in the Snatch in the men's 89kg event at the 2018 World Weightlifting Championships held in Ashgabat, Turkmenistan.

He won the gold medal in his event at the 2021 Pan American Weightlifting Championships held in Guayaquil, Ecuador. A month later, he competed in the men's 89kg event at the 2021 World Weightlifting Championships held in Tashkent, Uzbekistan.

He won the gold medal in the men's 96kg Snatch event at the 2022 Bolivarian Games held in Valledupar, Colombia. He also won the silver medal in the men's 96kg Clean & Jerk event. He won the gold medal in the men's 102kg event at the 2022 Pan American Weightlifting Championships held in Bogotá, Colombia.

Achievements

References

External links 
 

Living people
1995 births
Colombian male weightlifters
Weightlifters at the 2015 Pan American Games
Medalists at the 2015 Pan American Games
Pan American Games bronze medalists for Colombia
Pan American Games medalists in weightlifting
Pan American Weightlifting Championships medalists
World Weightlifting Championships medalists
21st-century Colombian people
People from Apartadó